José Antonio González Estrada (born 20 October 1995) is a Spanish footballer who plays for Recreativo de Huelva as a central midfielder.

Club career
Born in Puente Genil, Córdoba, Andalusia, González joined Córdoba CF's youth setup in 2013, from UD Alcolea Los Ángeles. He made his senior debut with the reserves on 12 May 2013, playing the last three minutes in a 1–0 Tercera División home win against CD Alcalá.

On 29 January 2015, after featuring sparingly, González was loaned to Martos CD in the fourth division, until June. Upon returning, he became a regular starter and achieved promotion to Segunda División B in 2016.

On 10 July 2017, González moved to another reserve team, Córdoba CF B in the third tier. On 15 August of the following year, he signed a new two-year contract and was promoted to the main squad in Segunda División.

González made his professional debut on 18 August 2018, coming on as a late substitute for Fede Vico in a 0–0 away draw against Elche CF. The following 16 July, after achieving promotion to La Liga, he renewed his contract until 2021 and was immediately loaned to Córdoba CF for one year. On 23 July 2020 he left Granada.

On 1 August 2020 he signed for Recreativo de Huelva.

References

External links

1995 births
Living people
Sportspeople from the Province of Córdoba (Spain)
Spanish footballers
Footballers from Andalusia
Association football midfielders
Segunda División players
Segunda División B players
Tercera División players
Córdoba CF B players
Martos CD footballers
Club Recreativo Granada players
Granada CF footballers
Córdoba CF players
Recreativo de Huelva players